The Tjeld class was a class of twenty fast patrol boats designed and built for the Royal Norwegian Navy in the late 1950s.
They were used as torpedo boats in Norway where this type of vessel were called MTBs or motor torpedo boats (motortorpedobåt). 
They remained in service until the late 1970s, when they were placed in reserve; all were stricken by 1995.

Construction
The Tjeld class was based on a prototype fast patrol boat, the Nasty, 
developed and introduced as a private venture 
by Boat Services Ltd. A/S, Oslo, in close cooperation with Royal Norwegian Navy officers with World War II experience in fast patrol boats; the chief designer being naval architect Jan Herman Linge.

The Norwegian Tjeld-class vessels were constructed at Westermoen Båtbyggeri in Mandal. 
The first group of twelve vessels was ordered in 1957, launched between 1959 and 1960, and commissioned in 1960-1962. 
A second group of eight vessels was ordered in 1962, launched 1962-63 and commissioned 1963-66.

The design was also marketed abroad, to the then-West German Navy and the U.S. Navy, where they were known as the Nasty class, and to the Hellenic Navy as the Tjeld, or Improved Nasty type.

The U.S. Navy operated twenty of the United States Nasty-class patrol boats, with pennant numbers PTF-3 through PTF-22, primarily in the conduct of riverine warfare during the Vietnam War. A subsequent improved version, the Osprey class, was larger with aluminum instead of wooden hulls, of which four were operated by the U.S.Navy, PTF-23 through PTF-26. Many examples were later transferred to and operated by Naval Reserve units in the 1970s and 1980s until phased out of service.  A handful survive as museum articles, either restored or currently undergoing restoration.

Service history
The twenty Tjeld class vessels remained in service until the late 1970s; Skarv was stricken in 1978 and six others in 1979, the remainder being laid up in reserve. All vessels had been disposed of by 1995.
All the vessels of the first group were named after seabirds; those of the second group were named for fish or sea mammals. These boats took over the names of other Tjeld-class vessels which had been sold in 1981.

List of vessels

First group

Second group

Notes

References

 

Patrol boat classes
Torpedo boats of the Royal Norwegian Navy
Napier Deltic
Ships built in Mandal, Norway
Fast attack craft